Daletice (Hungarian: Deléte) is a village and municipality in Sabinov District in the Prešov Region of north-eastern Slovakia.

History
In historical records the village was first mentioned in 1320.

Geography
The municipality lies at an altitude of 457 metres and covers an area of 2.489 km². It has a population107 people.

Genealogical resources

The records for genealogical research are available at the state archive "Statny Archiv in Presov, Slovakia"

 Roman Catholic church records (births/marriages/deaths): 1750-1896 (parish B)
 Greek Catholic church records (births/marriages/deaths): 1834-1895 (parish B)

See also
 List of municipalities and towns in Slovakia

References

External links
Surnames of living people in Daletice

Villages and municipalities in Sabinov District
Šariš